Eugénie is the French version of the female given name Eugenia.

Eugénie or Eugenie may refer to:

People
 Eugénie de Montijo (1826–1920), 9th Countess de Teba; later Empress Eugénie, Empress Consort to Napoléon III

 Princess Eugenie of Sweden and Norway (1830–1889), of the House of Bernadotte
 Victoria Eugenie of Battenberg (1887-1969), Queen consort of Spain and a granddaughter of Queen Victoria 
 Princess Eugénie of Greece and Denmark (1910–1989)
 Princess Eugenie of York (born 1990), British princess, daughter of Prince Andrew and Sarah, Duchess of York
 Eugenie Anderson (1909–1997), US ambassador, first woman appointed chief of mission at the ambassador level in US history
 Eugenie Besserer (1868–1934), French silent film actress
 Eugénie Blanchard (1896–2010), French supercentenarian
 Eugenie Bonaparte (1872–1949), aristocrat
 Eugenie Bouchard (born 1994), Canadian tennis player
 Eugenie Clark (1922–2015), American ichthyologist
 Eugenie Mary Ladenburg Davie (1895–1975), New York Republican activist
 Eugenie Forde (1879–1940), American silent film actress
 Eugenie Fougère (1870–?), French vaudeville and music hall singer and dancer
 Eugénie de Gramont (1788–1846), French nun of the Society of the Sacred Heart
 Eugénie de Guérin (1805–1848), French writer
 Eugénie D'Hannetaire (1746–1816), French actress
 Eugénie Henderson (1914–1989), British linguist and academic
 Eugénie Hunsicker, American mathematician working in England
 Eugénie De Keyser (1918–2012), Belgian writer
 Eugenie Leontovich (between 1893 and 1900 – 1993), Russian-American stage actress
 Eugénie Potonié-Pierre (1844–1898), French feminist
 Eugénie Rocherolle (born 1936), American composer, pianist, lyricist and teacher 
 Eugenie Sage (born 1957 or 1958), New Zealand politician and environmentalist
 Eugenie Schwarzwald (1872–1940), Austrian philanthropist
 Eugenie Scott (born 1945), American physical anthropologist
 Eugenie Mikhailovna Shakhovskaya (1889–1920), Russian pioneering aviator, first female military pilot
 Eugénie Söderberg (1903–1973), Swedish-American writer and journalist
 Eugénie Le Sommer (born 1989), French female footballer
 Eugenie van Leeuwen (born 1970), Dutch cricketer
 Eugénie Louise Zobian (born 1948), more commonly known as Lisa Lindahl, American inventor of the sports bra

Fictional characters
 The principal character of Philosophy in the Bedroom (La Philosophie dans le boudoir), a 1795 book by the Marquis de Sade
 Eugénie Danglars in The Count of Monte Cristo
 Eugenie Grandet in the eponymous novel by Honoré de Balzac
 Eugénie Sandler in Eugenie Sandler P.I. an Australian television series
 Eugenie Markham in Richelle Mead's Dark Swan series
 Eugenie Victoria is the given name of Bonnie Butler in Gone with the Wind

Other
 Eugenie… The Story of Her Journey into Perversion a 1970 film

French feminine given names

sv:Eugenia